Muraena argus, commonly known as the white-spotted moray, or the Argus moray, is a moray eel found in coral reefs from Mexico to Peru and around the Galápagos Islands. It was described by Franz Steindachner in 1870, originally under the genus Gymnothorax.

Due to its wide distribution, lack of known threats, and lack of observed population decline, the IUCN redlist currently lists M. argus as Least Concern.

References

External links
 

argus
Fish described in 1870